The Coolart Wetlands and Homestead Reserve, or just Coolart, is an 87.5 ha estate on the Western Port coast of the Mornington Peninsula of Victoria, south-eastern Australia, about 70 km south-east of Melbourne.  It comprises a late 19th-century mansion-like homestead and surrounding grounds west of the village of Somers. Coolart is the remnant of one of the oldest grazing properties on the Mornington Peninsula. The homestead is set in a garden with adjacent wetlands and coastal woodlands with walking tracks. It is managed by Parks Victoria and the homestead is open to the public. The homestead features an exhibition of historic photographs, and hosts changing art exhibitions.  Coolart is a popular venue for picnics, nature walks and birdwatching.

Description

Coolart is bordered by Merricks Creek on the south, Somers School Camp on the east, Balnarring Beach road on the west and privately owned farmland on the north. It contains the Coolart Homestead, a substantial two-storey brick house, with a third-storey tower and several outbuildings.  As well as a well-maintained garden there are several wetlands with a bird hide and a wetland observatory with educational facilities.  There are also areas of woodland and farmland. The wetlands are home to a breeding colony of over 1000 Australian white ibises, while koalas, swamp wallabies, and echidnas inhabit the woodlands.

History
Coolart was originally part of the traditional lands of the Bunurong people, with the word "coolart" deriving from "colourt" or "kulluk", the Bunurong name for nearby Sandy Point. With European settlement of the area Coolart was taken up as a pastoral lease in 1839 by the Meyrick brothers. Subsequently, the property went through various farming phases, including cropping and raising sheep and cattle.

The Coolart estate was purchased as a farming property in 1895 by Frederick Sheppard Grimwade, a Melbourne businessman and parliamentarian, with the homestead built immediately thereafter as his family's country retreat. The property passed through various hands during the early 20th century before it was acquired by Tom Luxton in 1937. Luxton persuaded the state government to declare the property a wildlife sanctuary and began a program of habitat development that included the construction of an artificial lake and other wetlands for waterbirds.

When Luxton died in 1968 Coolart was purchased by the Victorian State Government for conservation and education purposes. Parks Victoria took over the management of the property in 1996, advised by the Coolart Wetlands and Homestead Trust. Coolart's land and buildings are listed on the Victorian Heritage Register.

A plaque in the grounds of Coolart commemorates noted Australian author, photographer and ornithologist Graham Pizzey as its First Warden (1980-1984).

External links

 Parks Victoria: Coolart Homestead

References

Mornington Peninsula
Historic house museums in Victoria (Australia)
Birdwatching sites in Australia
Western Port
Nature reserves in Victoria (Australia)
Nature centres in Australia
Homesteads in Victoria